Madeline K. Sofia, also known as Maddie Sofia, is an American journalist and science communicator. She was the host of Short Wave, NPR's daily science podcast.

Education 
Sofia earned her PhD in microbiology from the University of Rochester Medical Center. Prior to graduate school, she got a BS in biology at the University of Mount Union.

Career 
Sofia is the former co-host of Short Wave, NPR's science podcast, which launched in October 2019.

On June 16, 2021 it was announced that Maddie Sofia will be leaving Shortwave in the fall of 2021 

Prior to beginning her work on Short Wave, Sofia was an assistant producer and associate producer on the NPR Science Desk. Sofia collaborated with Joe Palca on an NPR program that trains young science communicators, NPR Scicommers (formerly known as Friends of Joe's Big Idea or FOJBI). She was also part of a special series, Maddie About Science, which was a series of seven videos about science.

References 

NPR personalities
University of Rochester alumni
Science communicators
American podcasters
American women podcasters
American women journalists
Living people
Year of birth missing (living people)
21st-century American women